The 1981 Liberty Bowl, a college football postseason bowl game, was played on December 30, 1981, in Memphis, Tennessee, at Liberty Bowl Memorial Stadium. The 23rd edition of the Liberty Bowl featured the Ohio State Buckeyes from the Big Ten Conference facing the independent Navy Midshipmen. Ohio State won the game, 31–28.

Game summary

Source:

References

Liberty Bowl
Liberty Bowl
Ohio State Buckeyes football bowl games
Navy Midshipmen football bowl games
Liberty Bowl
December 1981 sports events in the United States